The Chapel of Saint Petka in Belgrade is a chapel, erected over a sacred spring, and dedicated to Saint Petka. It is located at a way connecting the upper and the lower city of the Belgrade Fortress, in proximity of the Ružica Church, with the spring being in the very altar of the chapel. The today's chapel is built in 1937 after a project of the architect Momir Korunović. Its inner walls and vaults are covered by mosaics done by painter Đuro Radulović in 1980-83.

History 
A chapel of Saint Petka in Belgrade was built in 1417 by an unknown dignitary when her relics were translated to Belgrade at the request of Princess Milica of Serbia to the sultan. The exact location of this chapel is not known, nor whether was it erected near the sacred spring. After Belgrade was captured in 1521, the relics were translated to Constantinople and in 1641 to Iași. The current chapel contains a piece of the relics.

Prior to today's chapel, a dugout chapel existed on the slope, decorated with icons and containing the sacred spring. Since it was in bad condition, after an initiative by Patriarch Varnava, the today's chapel was built and consecrated at Saint Petka's feast day in 1937. Digging the foundation uncovered remains of an older temple, and bones of soldiers who were killed in the defence of Belgrade in 1914 and 1915, that were transferred into a nearby ossuary. Also found were Turkish tombstones, including that of vizier Marashli Ali Pasha.

The chapel complex also includes a baptismal font and the parish home.

Chapel Painting 
The chapel was painted twice. The first paintings were done by an academician-painter Vladimir Predojević. The paintings have soon wasted because of the bad quality of materials used for the works, and so the second paintings were done as a mosaic. The second paintings were done by Belgrade painter Đuro Radlović between 1975. and 1982, and consecrated by Patriarch German on February 27 1983.

Friday prayers 
The chapel can be visited every day, but is most often visited on friday and slava days, especially at Saint Petka's feast day on October 27. Every friday morning a liturgy with reading of the canon of Saint Petka and kissing her holy relics is held in Ružica Church, while in the afternoon it is held in the chapel of Saint Petka.

The existence of the sacred spring is first mentioned in 1658 by Michel Quiclet. It has dried up once, after the withdrawal of the Serbian army from Serbia in 1915, but ran again in 1918 on the feast day of Saint Onesimus, so on this day a liturgy is being held in the chapel and the water is consecrated.

Gallery

References

Literature 

 Крстионица Свете Петке = The Baptistery of The Chapel of St. Petka / [Радомир В. Поповић ; приредио Петар А. Бојковић]. - Београд : Црква рођења Пресвете Богородице, 2005 ([Б. м. : б. и.]). - 23 стр. : илустр. ; 17 cm
 Преподобна мати Параскева Света Петка / приредио Владимир Вукашиновић. - Нови Сад : Арт-принт, 1999 (Нови Сад : Арт-принт). - 43 стр. ; 16 cm Део текста упоредо на срп. и енгл. језику. - На насл. стр. поред места издавања и: Београд
 Веровах, зато говорих : литургијске омилије и духовне поуке из капеле Свете Петке у Калемегданској тврђави протојереја-ставрофора Владимира Вукашиновића / приредио Никола Јоцић. - Врњци : Интерклима-графика, 2016 (Врњци : Интерклима-графика). - 158 стр. : илустр. ; 21 cm

External links 

 Православље - Цркве Ружица и Света Петка
 Београдске приче: Светло православља са шпица Београда („Вечерње новости”, 6. октобар 2016)
 Верници хрле на ово место у Београду

Chapels
Eastern Orthodox church buildings
Stari Grad, Belgrade
Serbian Orthodox churches in Belgrade